CAMP (also spelled C.A.M.P., and called Camp, the Italian abbreviation for "Concezione Articoli Montagna Premana"; the English equivalents are "Conception" (not "concession"), "Articles", "Mountains", "Premana") manufactures equipment for climbing and associated activities such as ski mountaineering and industrial   safety (i.e., working at heights).  The company is based in Italy.

CAMP manufactures a wide range of products, including ice axes, crampons, ice screws, pitons, carabiners, nuts, tricams, camming devices, harnesses, helmets, ropes, rucksacks, tents, ski-racing clothing, and various snow tools.

The company was founded by Nicola Codega, a blacksmith, in 1889 in the Italian alpine village of Premana, where it is still based. Originally producing wrought-iron goods, an order in 1920 for ice axes for the Italian army was their first foray into the world of climbing equipment. From there the company extended its climbing range to include crampons, pitons, and nuts, and eventually (with the encouragement of mountaineer Riccardo Cassin and collaboration with American climber and entrepreneur Greg Lowe) into non-metallic equipment. The company is still run by Codega's descendants.

References

External links
CAMP website

Manufacturing companies established in 1889
Italian companies established in 1889
Italian brands
Sporting goods manufacturers of Italy
Climbing and mountaineering equipment companies
Camping equipment manufacturers